Gölyeri is a village and municipality in the Yardymli Rayon of Azerbaijan.  It has a population of 508.  The municipality consists of the villages of Gölyeri and Təzəkənd.

References 

Populated places in Yardimli District